Subwoolfer was a British-Norwegian pop duo formed in 2021. The two members performed in black suits with white shirts with distinctive yellow stylized wolf-head masks and yellow gloves and ties and go by the pseudonyms Keith and Jim. After winning , they represented Norway in the Eurovision Song Contest 2022 with their debut song "Give That Wolf a Banana". The name of the duo was a combination of the words subwoofer and wolf.

History 

Having been selected as an automatically qualified finalist, they were scheduled to showcase their entry "Give That Wolf a Banana" in the third heat of the competition on 29 January. However, their performance was postponed to the fourth heat, due to a positive COVID-19 test. They performed "Give That Wolf a Banana" again in the final on 19 February, and went on to win the competition with 368,106 votes from the public. With their victory, they were selected to represent Norway in the Eurovision Song Contest 2022, which was held in Turin, Italy.

On 11 February 2022, Subwoolfer released a Valentine's Day version of "Give That Wolf a Banana", titled "Give That Wolf a Romantic Banana". As of 17 June 2022, "Give That Wolf a Banana" has been streamed more than 20.4 million times on Spotify, with its Valentine edition having been streamed over 918 thousand times.

As Keith and Jim dress in yellow wolf-like masks during performances, the duo's real identities remained undisclosed throughout 2022. Their desired anonymity led to some speculation on social media regarding their identities. At the time, Keith and Jim's speculated identities included the Ylvis brothers, Gaute Ormåsen, Ben Adams and Erik & Kriss. A fictional origin story about the duo states that they are the "most successful band in our galaxy," and began their career "4.5 billion years ago on the Moon."

On 10 May 2022, NRK filmed DJ Astronaut taking off his helmet, with his identity speculated to be Tix, the Norwegian entrant at the Eurovision Song Contest 2021. This was later denied by the Norwegian head of delegation, Stig Karlsen, and Tix himself. Tix was later revealed to be the Norwegian jury spokesperson for the Eurovision 2022 final.

On 23 May 2022, Subwoolfer announced that "new music [would be] out soon" in a music video on YouTube for their parody of "Grace Kelly" by Mika, titled "Space Kelly"  which had gained over 1 million views as of 17 June 2022. On 1 July 2022, Subwoolfer released "Melocoton (The Donka Donk Song)", their first song since the Eurovision Song Contest. It was accompanied by a music video.

On 21 October 2022, Subwoolfer released a new single, "Howling", which features guest vocals from Luna Ferrari, the "sister" of Keith and Jim. The music video for Howling was released on 21 October 2022. In December 2022, Subwoolfer made a short guest appearance on The Big Fat Quiz of the Year after a question on their Eurovision entry was featured in the music round.

Discography

Singles

References

Norwegian pop music groups
Eurovision Song Contest entrants for Norway
Eurovision Song Contest entrants of 2022
Melodi Grand Prix contestants
Melodi Grand Prix winners
Masked musicians
Norwegian musical duos
Universal Music Group artists
Musical groups disestablished in 2023
Musical groups established in 2022